Fauler See is a lake in Schwerin, Mecklenburg-Vorpommern, Germany. At an elevation of 39.5 m, its surface area is 0.5 km².

References

Lakes of Mecklenburg-Western Pomerania